Buryatia, officially the Republic of Buryatia, is a republic of Russia located in the Russian Far East. Formerly part of the Siberian Federal District, it has been administered as part of the Far Eastern Federal District since 2018. Its capital is the city of Ulan-Ude. It is home to the indigenous Buryats.

Geography

The republic is located in the south-central region of Siberia along the eastern shore of Lake Baikal.
Area: 
Borders:
Internal: Irkutsk Oblast (W/NW/N), Zabaykalsky Krai (NE/E/SE/S), Tuva (W)
International: Mongolia (Bulgan Province, Khövsgöl Province and Selenge Province) (S/SE)
Water: Lake Baikal (N)
Highest point: Mount Munku-Sardyk

Rivers
Major rivers include:
Barguzin River
Irkut River
Kitoy River
Oka River
Selenga River
Uda River
Upper Angara River
Vitim River

Lakes
Lake Baikal - Buryatia covers 60% of the lake's shoreline.
Lake Gusinoye
Baunt
Busani
Kapylyushi
Yeravna-Khorga Lake System

Mountains
Over 80% of the republic's territory is located in the mountainous region, including the Baikal Mountains on the northern shores of Lake Baikal, the Ulan-Burgas east of the lake, and the Selenga Highlands in the south near the Mongolia–Russia border.

Natural resources
The republic's natural resources include gold, tungsten, zinc, uranium, and more.

Climate
Average annual temperature:   
Average January temperature: 
Average July temperature: 
Average annual precipitation:

History

Mongolian people have lived around the area of Lake Baikal since the fifth century, with Mongolic-related Slab Grave cultural monuments found in Baikal territory. Over time, the Mongolic peoples of the regions developed into distinct groups, one of which became the Buryats. Further divisions of the Buryats came from those living on the western shore of Lake Baikal, with better land for agriculture, and those in the east, who practiced nomadism more regularly and continued residing in moveable felt yurts. As a result of the superior farmland, the western side of Lake Baikal was settled by European peasants during the time of the Russian Empire - western Buryats were more exposed to and influenced by the culture, religions, and economy of their European neighbors, whereas the eastern Buryats maintained closer ties to other Mongolic peoples, Buddhism, and Asian civilizations.

The territory of Buryatia has been governed by the Xiongnu Empire (209 BC-93 CE) and Mongolian Xianbei state (93-234), Rouran Khaganate (330-555), Tang Dynasty (647–784), Mongol Empire (1206-1368), and Northern Yuan (1368-1635). Medieval Mongol tribes such as the Merkit, Bayads, Barga Mongols and Tümeds inhabited in Buryatia.

Imperial Russia 
Cossacks and other tsarists officials began moving eastward into the western Buryat lands in 1625, where they estimated 30,000 Buryats were living in southeastern Siberia, collecting tribute from other, small Siberian tribes. The Buryats resisted the incorporation into the Russian Empire's tribute system (yasak) that demanded a yearly supply of furs; it was not until the 1680s that the last of the eastern Buryat lands were forced to participate in the yasak system. In 1666, the fort of Udinskoye was founded. This area later became known as Verkhneudinsk – in 1934, it was renamed Ulan-Ude, the present-day capital of Buryatia.

From 1727 it was the border crossing for the Kyakhta trade between Russia and China. Kyakhta's founder, the Serb Sava Vladislavich, established it as a trading point between Russia and the Qing Empire. The 1820 reforms of Mikhail Speransky established indirect rule over Buryatia by codifying the local clan leaders as official members of the "steppe duma" in order to incorporate them into the existing imperial government.

Buddhism was recognized as an official religion of the Russian Empire by Empress Elizabeth in 1741, with the first Pandito Khambo Lama, the spiritual leader of Buryat Buddhists, elected in 1764. The first person to serve in this role was Damba Dorzha Zaiaev (1711 - 1776). At the time of the Bolshevik Revolution, Dashi-Dorzho Itigilov served as the 12th Pandito Khambo Lama of Eastern Siberia from 1911 to 1917. Itigilov stepped down in 1917 at the time of the revolution and later encouraged his students to flee to Mongolia, though he refused to flee himself.

Soviet Buryatia 
National movements, including that of Buryatia, began to foment after the February Revolution in 1917. From March 1917, the leading Buryat intelligentsia organized a number of conferences in cities such as Petrograd, Chita, Irkutsk, and Verkhneudinsk (present-day Ulan-Ude) and invited representatives from Buryat administrative districts of the Irkutsk and Transbaikalia regions. The culmination of these conferences was the first All-Buryat Congress in April 23-25, 1917 in Chita, where activists advocated for a self-governing Buryat Autonomous Region, based on the models of Poland and Finland, with an elected body, the Buryat National Duma, that all Buryats, men and women, over the age of 18 and without criminal convictions, would participate in. This Duma would elect a permanent executive body, the Buryat National committee, which would take on responsibilities such as organizing the elections, assembling the Buryat Duma, and publishing works in the Buryat language. Among other topics discussed at the Congress were the establishment of an Education Council to create Buryat schools, trained educators, and curricula that included the history of the Buryats and Mongols, Buryat studies, and the history of Mongolian literature. 

After the November Revolution in 1917, the Buryats bid for independence was complicated by the arrival of a Japanese expeditionary force into Buryatia in 1918. The Buryat national leaders saw the Japanese as potential and critical allies in assisting the independence movement, but the cooperation ultimately failed due to the conflicting agendas. The Red Army advanced in Buryatia in 1920 and continued to Outer Mongolia in 1921. Attracted to the promises of self-determination and territorial autonomy by the Bolsheviks, and having lost the cooperation of the Japanese, the Buryat leaders embraced the idea of building a Buryat nation with the new Soviet state. In 1923, the Buryat-Mongolian Autonomous Soviet Socialist Republic was created as a result of the merger of State of Buryat-Mongolia and Mongol-Buryat Oblasts and promised territorial autonomy. In 1937, Aga Buryatia and Ust-Orda Buryatia were detached from the Buryat-Mongolian ASSR and merged with Chita and Irkutsk Oblasts, respectively. In 1958, the name "Mongol" was removed from the name of the republic. 

The Buryat intelligentsia were active throughout Buryatia and beyond, into Tibet and Mongolia, some with the goals of Pan-Mongolism. At the turn of the 20th century, Buryats leaders, such as Batu-dalai Ochirov and Mikhail Bogdanov, began actively writing political articles about the threat to Buryatia and Buryat existence from Russia. Despite their noted influence from 1900 to 1930, most of them were purged, killed outright or sent to concentration camps, in the 1930s. 

The leader of the Buryat ASSR from 1962 to 1984 was Andrei Urupkheevich Modogoev. In the 1970s, Soviet authorities began two major industrial projects in Buryatia: the Gusinoozerskii power station to the south of Ulan-Ude and the construction of the Baikal–Amur Mainline railway in northern Buraytia. The construction of both projects, particularly the railway, required recruiting campaigns to bring workers from other parts of the country to Buryatia. Towns developed along the railroad, and the urban population in northern Buryatia doubled between 1979 and 1989. In addition to the Russians who moved to Buryatia for work, Buryats from other parts of southern Siberia also migrated to the Buryat ASSR, particularly Ulan-Ude and other cities for jobs and educational opportunities. Prior to World War II, less than 10% of Buryats lived in urban areas, compared to almost half at the time of the fall of the Soviet Union. By 1989, one-third of the Buryat population of the Buryat ASSR was living in Ulan-Ude.

Post-Soviet Buryatia 
The Buryat ASSR declared its sovereignty in 1990 and adopted the name Republic of Buryatia in 1992. However, it remained an autonomous republic within the Russian Federation. On 11 July 1995 Buryatia signed a power-sharing agreement with the federal government, granting it autonomy. This agreement was abolished on 15 February 2002.

Following the dissolution of the Soviet Union, autonomous republics such as Buryatia did not have the right to secede. However they retained considerable autonomy, with a separate legislature and president. However this autonomy has been curtailed following the 2004 law passed by Vladimir Putin that decreed regional governors and presidents were to be appointed, rather than directly elected.

The Free Buryatia Foundation was founded in March 2022 in response to the 2022 Russian invasion of Ukraine, by opponents of the war in Buryatia and members of the global Buryats diaspora.

Politics

The head of the Republic is the Head (formerly President), who the voters of the republic elect for a four-year term. From 2004 to 2012 the head of Buryatia (along with all other heads of regions in Russia) was nominated directly by the Russian President.

Between 1991 and 2007, the President was Leonid Vasilyevich Potapov, who was elected on July 1, 1994, re-elected in 1998 (with 63.25% of votes), and then re-elected again on June 23, 2002 (with over 67% of votes). Prior to the elections, Potapov was the Chairman of the Supreme Soviet of the Republic—the highest post at that time.

The current Head of the Republic is Alexey Tsydenov, who was elected by popular vote on 10 September 2017. Prior to this he was acting Head, having been appointed by Russian President Vladimir Putin in February 2017.

The Republic's parliament is the People's Khural, popularly elected every five years.  The People's Khural has 66 deputies and is currently dominated by the country's ruling party, United Russia, with 45 seats. Vladimir Anatolyevich Pavlov has been Chairman of the People's Khural since September 2019.

The Republic's Constitution was adopted on February 22, 1994.

Administrative divisions

Demographics
Population:

Settlements

Vital statistics

Source: Russian Federal State Statistics Service

Demographics for 2007
Source:

Ethnic groups
According to the 2021 Census, ethnic Russians make up 64% of the republic's population, while the ethnic Buryats comprise 32.5% of the population.  Other groups include Soyots (0.5%) and a host of smaller groups, each accounting for less than 0.5% of the total population.

Religion

Traditionally, Buryats adhered to belief systems that were based on the deification of nature, belief in spirits, and the possibility of their magic influence on the surroundings. They were led by shamans, who systematized tribal beliefs and cults. From the second half of the 17th century, beliefs and cults in the shamanic form were displaced by Buddhism, which became widespread in ethnic Buryatia. By the end of the 19th century, the majority of Buryats were part of the Buddhist tradition. A synthesis of Buddhism and traditional beliefs that formed a system of ecological traditions has constituted a major attribute of Buryat culture. In 2003, the Local Religious Organization of Shamans, Tengeri was officially registered as a religious organization in Buryatia.

As of a 2012 survey 27.4% of the population adheres to the Russian Orthodox Church, 19.8% to Buddhism, 2% to the Slavic Native Faith, Tengrism or Buryat shamanism, 4% declares to be unaffiliated Christian (excluding Protestants), 1% are Orthodox Christian believers without belonging to churches or are members of other Orthodox churches, 1% are members of Protestant churches. In addition, 25% of the population declares to be "spiritual but not religious", 13% to be atheist, and 10.8% follows another religion or did not give an answer to the survey.

Tibetan Buddhism and Orthodox Christianity are the most widespread religions in the republic. Many Slavs, who constitute around 67% of the population, are Russian Orthodox. Since the breakup of the USSR in 1991, a small number have converted to various Protestant denominations or to Rodnovery, Slavic native faith. There are also some Catholics among the Slavs. Most of the Germans (0.11% of the population) are also Orthodox, so are some other non-European groups like Armenians (0.23%), Georgians (0.03%), and Soyot (0.37%). Buryats constitute 30.04% of the total population.

Most urban Buryats are either Buddhist or Orthodox, while those in the rural areas often adhere to Yellow shamanism, a mixture of shamanism and Buddhism, or to Black shamanism. There are also Tengrist movements. Siberian Tatars are around 0.7% of the population. However, due to isolation from the main body of Tatars, many of them now are either non-religious or Orthodox. Islam is followed by immigrant groups like Azeris and Uzbeks, who constitute another 0.7% of the population.

Education
The higher education institutions of the republic include Buryat State University, Buryat State Academy of Agriculture, East Siberian State Academy of Arts and Culture, and East Siberia State University of Technology and Management.

Economy

The republic's economy is composed of agricultural and commercial products including wheat, vegetables, potatoes, timber, leather, graphite, and textiles. Fishing, hunting, fur farming, sheep and cattle farming, mining, stock raising, engineering, and food processing are also important economic generators.
The unemployment rate of Buryatia was 11% in 2020.

GDP pro person nominal in 2018 was 3,650 USD and PPP in 2009 was 11,148 USD.

Tourism
Lake Baikal is a popular tourist destination, especially in summer.

See also

Music of Buryatia
Ust-Orda Buryat Autonomous Okrug

Notes

References

Sources

Further reading

 Anthology of Buryat folklore, Pushkinskiĭ dom, 2000 (CD)

External links

Official website of the Republic of Buryatia
 Official website of the Republic of Buryatia
Official website of the Republic of Buryatia (in Buryat)
 Buryatia.org, site about life in the Republic of Buryatia
Article on Buddhism in Buryatia and Mongolia
 Informational website of Buryatia

 
 
Russian-speaking countries and territories
States and territories established in 1923
1923 establishments in the Soviet Union
Russian Far East
Far Eastern Federal District